Westfield State University (commonly known as Westfield State) is a public university in Westfield, Massachusetts. It was founded in 1839 by Horace Mann as the first public co-educational college in America without barrier to race, gender, or economic class.

Rankings
In 2013, WSU was ranked fourth nationally by US News in their Best Online Programs Honor Roll.  WSU was also ranked first in the country for "Faculty Credentials & Training" and eleventh in "Student Services & Technology".

Academics

Full and part-time programs lead to undergraduate bachelor's and advanced degrees, including: the Bachelor of Arts (B.A.), Bachelor of Science, (B.S.), Bachelor of Social Work (B.S.W.), Bachelor of Special Education (B.S.E.), Master of Education (M.Ed.), Master of Science (M.S.), Master of Arts (M.A.), Master of Public Administration (M.P.A.), Master of Social Work (M.S.W.) and newly Physician Assistant Studies (M.S.). There are 31 undergraduate majors, 34 minors, and 43 different concentrations at Westfield State University.

Westfield State University's Division of Graduate and Continuing Education offers a variety of master's degrees and graduate certificates. Classes are offered on-campus and/or online. Graduate study, post-baccalaureate teacher licensure, and community education courses are offered.

Accreditation
Westfield State University is accredited by the New England Commission of Higher Education. In addition, its teacher licensure programs are accredited by the National Council for Accreditation of Teacher Education (NCATE), and the Massachusetts Department of Elementary and Secondary Education, Educator Preparation and Quality. The Athletic Training program is accredited by the Commission on Accreditation of Athletic Training Education (CAATE); The Health Fitness program by the Commission on Accreditation of Allied Health Education Programs (CAAHEP) and the Social Work program by the Council on Social Work Education (CSWE) Its music program is accredited by the National Association of Schools of Music (NASM), while the Computer Science program is accredited by the Computing Accreditation Commission (CAC) of the Accreditation Board for Engineering and Technology (ABET). WSU has also been designated as a Commonwealth of Massachusetts-accredited Emergency Medical Technician (EMT) training institution.

Campus life
There are nine on-campus housing options and over 75 active student recreational, social and academic clubs and organizations. A number of programs of activities are provided by the honor societies at Westfield, they include: Alpha Phi Sigma (Criminal Justice), Kappa Delta Phi (Education), Lambda Iota Tau (Literature) Lambda Pi Eta (Communication Studies), Lambda Sigma (college service), Phi Alpha Theta (History), Phi Kappa Phi (superior scholarship in all disciplines), Pi Delta Phi (French), Pi Sigma Alpha (Political Science), Psi Chi (Psychology), Sigma Delta Pi (Spanish and Hispanic Culture), and Sigma Xi (Science and Engineering).

Athletics

Westfield State University received the Howard C. Smith Cup from the Massachusetts State College Athletic Conference in the spring of 2017 in recognition of the best athletics program in the state – the third consecutive time and 13th overall that the program has received in its history.

At Westfield State, 21 varsity teams compete in Division III of the NCAA, representing 13% of the student body. The Westfield State Owls, with mascot “Nestor,” meet the competition in the blue and white colors of the university.

The varsity intercollegiate teams for fall are field hockey and women's cross country, volleyball, golf and soccer, as well as football and men's cross country, golf and soccer. Winter teams include women's basketball, indoor track, and swimming and diving, as well as men's basketball, ice hockey and indoor track, and coed cheering. The spring teams are softball, women's golf, lacrosse and track and field, as well as baseball, and men's golf and track and field.

Notable alumni
 George B. Cortelyou (1882) - U.S. Secretary of the Treasury and Secretary of Commerce, 1903–1904

 Nettie Stevens (1883) - discoverer of the X and Y chromosomes
 Eduardo C. Robreno (1967) - the first Cuban-American federal court judge
 Marsha Bemko (1977) - Executive Producer, Antiques Roadshow (PBS)
 Peter Laviolette (1986) - ice hockey player and coach 
 Christopher Donelan (1987) - Sheriff of Franklin County
 Domenic Sarno (1993) - Mayor of Springfield
 Chris Caputo (2002) - Head Coach of the George Washington Colonials men's basketball team
 Todd M. Smola (2004) - Representative from Palmer
 Alice Mary Dowd, American educator, author
 Geraldo Alicea - Former representative for the 6th Worcester District in the Massachusetts House of Representatives
 William D. Mullins – member of the Massachusetts House of Representatives and baseball player

References

External links
 
 Official athletics website

 
Westfield, Massachusetts
Educational institutions established in 1838
Public universities and colleges in Massachusetts
Universities and colleges in Hampden County, Massachusetts
1838 establishments in Massachusetts